The Hon. Cecil John Lawless (1821 – 5 November 1853), was an Irish politician.

Background
Lawless was a younger son of Valentine Lawless, 2nd Baron Cloncurry, and Emily, daughter of Archibald Douglas.

Political career
Lawless sat as Member of Parliament for Clonmel between 1846 and 1853. He was initially elected as a Repeal Association candidate, but was re-elected as a Whig in 1852. However, later the same year he again changed allegiance, this time to the Independent Irish Party.

Personal life
Lawless married Frances Georgina, daughter of Jonas Morris Townsend and widow of John Digby, in 1848. He died in November 1853. His wife later remarried and died in 1890.

References

External links
 

1821 births
1853 deaths
Younger sons of barons
UK MPs 1841–1847
UK MPs 1847–1852
UK MPs 1852–1857
Members of the Parliament of the United Kingdom for County Tipperary constituencies (1801–1922)
Irish Repeal Association MPs
Whig (British political party) MPs for Irish constituencies